Neoregelia concentrica is a species of bromeliad in the genus Neoregelia. This species is endemic to Brazil.

References

BSI Cultivar Registry Retrieved 11 October 2009

concentrica
Endemic flora of Brazil